EQ2 or variation, may refer to:

 EverQuest II, an MMO-RPG released in 2004
 The Equalizer 2, an action film released in 2018
 Sky-Watcher EQ2, a telescope equatorial mount
 Chery eQ2, an electric car

See also

 EQ (disambiguation)
 Q2 (disambiguation)
 E2 (disambiguation)
 2 (disambiguation)